, son of Nobuhisa, was a kugyo or Japanese court noble of the early Edo period (1603–1868). He did not hold regent positions kampaku and sessho. The regent Takatsukasa Fusasuke was his son. His other son Kujō Kaneharu was adopted by the Kujō family. His daughter Takatsukasa Nobuko married the fifth shōgun Tokugawa Tsunayoshi.

Family 
Parents
Father: Takatsukasa Nobuhisa (鷹司 信尚, 17 May 1590 – 31 December 1621)
Mother:  Imperial Princess Seishi (清子内親王; 1593–1674), daughter of Emperor Go-Yozei

Consorts and issues:
Wife: Princess Bunchi (文智女王)  (1619-1697), daughter of Emperor Go-Mizunoo
Concubine: Tamemitsu Reizei's daughter (冷泉為満)
Takatsukasa Fusasuke (鷹司 房輔, June 22, 1637 – March 1, 1700), first son
Kujō Kaneharu (九条 兼晴, 1641 – 1677), third son
Takatsukasa Nobuko (鷹司信子, 1651–1709), Wife of Tokugawa Tsunayoshi
Takatsukasa Fusako (鷹司房子, October 12, 1653 – May 19, 1712), consort of Emperor Reigen
Concubine: Unknown name
Toshimi (俊海), second son

References
 

1609 births
1668 deaths
Fujiwara clan
Takatsukasa family